Baba Guru Nanak University (Punjabi and ; bābā gurū nānaka yūnīvarasiṭī) is a public university located in Nankana Sahib, Punjab, Pakistan, the birthplace of Guru Nanak. On 28 October 2019, Prime Minister of Pakistan, Imran Khan laid the foundation stone of the university.

Introduction
Baba Guru Nanak University (BGNU) is a university and this project is given to Shafiq Construction Company which is under construction  in Nankana Sahib, in the Punjab region of Pakistan. It plans to facilitate between 5,000 and 10,000 students from all over the world at the university.

Master plan
The plans are for it to be modeled along the lines of renowned universities like Oxford and Cambridge, with focus on Punjabi language and Khalsa studies offering faculties in "Medicine", "Dentistry", "Pharmacy", "Engineering", "Computer science", "Languages", "Music" and "Social sciences".

Foundation stone
The Pakistani government's Evacuee Trust Property Board announced that the university's groundbreaking will commence by the end of August 2016. The foundation stone for the university was laid for second time on October 28, 2019 ahead of 550th Guru Nanak Gurpurab.

Project cost
Rupees 6 billion is to be spent on construction of Baba Guru Nanak University project in Nankana Sahib.

Proposed names
The "World Muslim Sikh Federation" (WMSF) proposes that the name of the university should be one of the following three:

Guru Nanak International University
Baba Nanak International University
Nanak International University

See also
Kartarpur Corridor
Pakistan Sikh Gurdwara Prabandhak Committee
Sikhism in Pakistan
Guru Nanak Dev University

References

Public universities in Punjab, Pakistan
Universities and colleges in Nankana Sahib District
Memorials to Guru Nanak
Nankana Sahib District
Sikhism in Pakistan
Public universities and colleges in Punjab, Pakistan
2020 establishments in Pakistan